Isturgia penthearia, the penthearia moth, is a moth of the  family Geometridae. It is found in Australia.

References

Macariini
Moths of Australia
Moths described in 1857